The 1928 United States Senate election in Missouri was held on November 6, 1928. Incumbent Democratic U.S. Senator James A. Reed did not run for re-election to a third term. Republican U.S. Representative Roscoe C. Patterson defeated Democrat Charles Hay to win the open seat.

Democratic primary

Candidates
James A. Collet, Chariton County prosecutor
Charles M. Hay, prohibitionist and candidate for U.S. Senate in 1920
Robert I. Young

Results

Republican primary

Candidates
William O. Atkeson, former U.S. Representative from Butler (1921–23)
Bernard Bogy, perennial candidate
Henry Bundschu, Jackson County attorney
Nathan Frank, former U.S. Representative from St. Louis (1889–91)
Roscoe C. Patterson, United States Attorney for the Western District of Missouri and former U.S. Representative from Springfield (1921–23)
 David M. Proctor, candidate for Senate in 1922 and 1926

Results

General election

Results

See also
1928 United States Senate elections
List of United States senators from Missouri

References

1928
Missouri
United States Senate